Eva Barbro Helen Åkesson (born 30 December 1961 in Ängelholm) is a Swedish professor of chemical physics who was the Rector of Uppsala University 2012-2020. She was previously Pro-Rector of Lund University.

Career

After taking the social sciences programme at Ängelholm Upper Secondary School, Åkesson studied chemistry at Umeå University, completing her doctorate in physical chemistry in 1989. She subsequently joined the faculty of Lund University as a researcher and teacher, later serving as director of studies in chemistry. In 2003, Rector Göran Bexell appointed her to one of the two newly established positions as Vice-Rector at Lund University, with special responsibility for undergraduate studies.

In 2008 she was invited to apply for the position of Rector, to succeed Bexell. Although Per Eriksson was appointed as Rector, the university board made it clear at an early stage that it wished to see Åkesson as Pro-Rector of the university, and she was formally appointed to this position on 15 December 2008. She was Pro-Rector 2009–2011.

In 2011 she became Professor of chemical physics at Lund University.

On 11 October 2011, the University Board of Uppsala University proposed Eva Åkesson as the new Rector (formally known as Rectrix Magnifica). The government decided on 24 November 2011 to appoint her Rector from 1 January 2012, succeeding Anders Hallberg. The inauguration was held on 16 December 2011. She was the first woman to become Rector of Uppsala University.

In February 2014, eight deans (faculty heads) and three vice-rectors (who head the university’s Disciplinary Domains) at Uppsala university demanded that Åkesson leave her position, with allegations of a poor leadership style on her part. The university board (consistory) gave Åkesson their vote of confidence and she remained, while the three vice-rectors left their positions. A year later, Åkesson commented on the leadership crisis, saying that she could have prepared herself better for her position as Rector.

Åkesson's appointment as Rector in Uppsala ended at the end of 2020. On 18 December 2020 her successor, Anders Hagfeldt, was inaugurated.

Honours 

 Member of the Royal Society of Arts and Sciences of Uppsala, 2011
 Honorary member of Uplands nation, 2012
 Honorary member of Rotary Östra Uppsala, 2014
 Honorary member of Lund Science Student Union, 2014
 Honorary Curator, Lund student nations, 2014
 Honorary Doctorate, University of Edinburgh, June 2015

Personal life 
She is the daughter of Mikko Åkesson and Barbro Lundegård and was formerly married to Henrik Hedman, an upper secondary school teacher. She lives in Uppsala.

References

External links 
 The Vice-Chancellor’s Blog (Uppsala University)

20th-century Swedish chemists
21st-century Swedish chemists
Swedish women chemists
Rectors of Uppsala University
1961 births
Living people
Umeå University alumni
Women heads of universities and colleges